Leonid Ivanovych Masunov (born 5 May 1962) is a retired Ukrainian middle-distance runner who represented Soviet Union at the 1985 European Athletics Indoor Championships in 800 and 1500 metres where he won a bronze medal in 800 metres. He also represented Soviet Union at the 1987 World Championships in Athletics in 1500 metres.

In Soviet national competitions, Masunov represented Ukraine and won several medals at the national championships, both indoors and outdoors.

He is a current Ukrainian record holder in 800 metres (1:45.08) set in 1984 and held the indoor national record in the same event between 1985 and 2004.

After retirement, he worked as an athletics coach in Odesa (1990-1998).

Key international appearances

References

External links 

 
 Leonid Masunov in Encyclopedia of Modern Ukraine 

1962 births
Living people
Armed Forces sports society athletes
Ukrainian male middle-distance runners
Soviet male middle-distance runners
Soviet Athletics Championships winners
Sportspeople from Omsk
K. D. Ushinsky South Ukrainian National Pedagogical University alumni